The 1967 SMU Mustangs football team represented Southern Methodist University (SMU) as a member of the Southwest Conference (SWC) during the 1967 NCAA University Division football season. Led by sixth-year head coach Hayden Fry, the Mustangs compiled an overall record of 3–7 with a conference mark of 3–4, placing sixth in the SWC.

Schedule

References

SMU
SMU Mustangs football seasons
SMU Mustangs football